Grinnell Lake is located in Glacier National Park, in the U. S. state of Montana. Named after George Bird Grinnell, the lake has an opaque turquoise appearance from the rock flour (silt) which is transported to the lake from Grinnell Glacier. It lies below the north face of Angel Wing.

Gallery

See also
List of lakes in Glacier County, Montana

References

Lakes of Glacier National Park (U.S.)
Lakes of Glacier County, Montana